This is a list of series released by or aired on TVB Jade Channel in 2003.

Top ten drama series in ratings
The following is a list of the highest-rated drama series released by TVB in 2003. The list includes premiere week and final week ratings.

First line series
These dramas aired in Hong Kong from 8:00 to 9:00 pm, Monday to Friday on TVB.

Second line series
These dramas aired in Hong Kong from 9:00 to 10:00 pm (9:05 to 9:35 pm from 5 May onwards), Monday to Friday on TVB.

Third line series
These dramas aired in Hong Kong from 10:05 to 11:05 pm (9:30 to 10:30 pm from 5 May onwards), Monday to Friday on TVB.

Weekend Dramas

Saturday series
These dramas aired in Hong Kong from 9:30 to 10:30 pm, Saturday on TVB.

Sunday series
These dramas aired in Hong Kong from 9:30 to 10:30 pm, Sunday on TVB.

Warehoused series
These dramas were released overseas and have not broadcast on TVB Jade Channel.

External links
  TVB.com

TVB dramas
2003 in Hong Kong television